Dafo Temple may refer to:

Dafo Temple (Guangzhou), in Guangzhou, Guangdong, China
Dafo Temple (Xinchang), in Zhejiang, China
Dafo Temple, Zhangye, in Zhangye, China

Buddhist temple disambiguation pages